Johnnie Newt (born July 9, 1979), better known by his stage name J. Valentine, is an American R&B singer and songwriter. He has written songs for the likes of artists such as Tyrese (“I Like Them Girls”), and the title track to N’Sync’s 9× platinum Celebrity album which sold 1.8 million in the first week. Mario’s “How Could You,” and Omarion’s "I'm Tryna" can also be credited to his resume,  along with displaying vocals on two posthumous 2Pac albums, Still I Rise and Until the End of Time.

Early life
Valentine was born in The Fillmore District of San Francisco, California. As a kid, J. and his brothers would go down to Fisherman's Wharf where they were street performers. J. attended Balboa High School, where he played varsity basketball all four years of high school and AAU along with the likes of NBA players Drew Gooden and Deshawn Stevenson. J. was also seen in Keyshia Cole's debut video "I Changed my Mind" as her love interest and worked on her last album as a producer and songwriter. He is of African American and Chinese ancestry.

Musical career
When Valentine was 9 years old, he and his brother formed the band The Newtrons. Early on he founded the CityBoyZ Muzik label and signed hip-hop artist Bailey, and subsequently released the song “Go Dumb” which was originally a record from his Hide Ya Breezy mixtape.

Valentine's 2011 album The Testimony featured artists Keri Hilson, Tank, Twista, Gucci Mane and LeToya Luckett. The album accumulated over 17 thousand records sold and reached the iTunes top 10 for R&B/Soul. Valentine recorded “My Girl” with Chris Brown for In My Zone 2.

Valentine's production company, Song Dynasty, includes his brother Bobby Newt, his friend Texx and the singer Tank. The team has written and produced songs for artists such as Jamie Foxx, Keyshia Cole and Ron Isley. They recently produced Now or Never, Tank's first Atlantic Records project. The album's second single, “Emergency,” held the number 5 spot on the Billboard music charts. They wrote the song “Regret” for R&B singer LeToya Luckett featuring Ludacris, which also peaked at #78 on the U.S. Billboard Hot 100 chart and #8 on the Billboard Hot R&B/Hip-Hop Songs chart.

Valentine scored his first #1 single on the R&B charts with Tank in 2022, with the successful single "Slow".

Valentine and Tank are the hosts of a weekly podcast called R&B Money, where the two discuss R&B music and other topics with some of the genre's current stars and its greatest legends.

Discography

Albums

Mixtape

References

External links
 Official Website

Living people
Singers from San Francisco
American contemporary R&B singers
1979 births
Songwriters from San Francisco
American male singer-songwriters
21st-century American singers
21st-century American male singers
Singer-songwriters from California